Haighton is a surname. Notable people with the name include:

 Alfred Haighton (1896–1943), Dutch fascist politician and businessman
 Elise Haighton (1841–1911), Dutch feminist and free thinker
 John Haighton (1755–1823), English physician and physiologist

See also
 Haighton, a civil parish in Lancashire, England